Anais Garcia Balmaña (born 29 September 1980) is a vision impaired B1/S11 swimmer from Spain. She is the daughter of Spanish architect and decorator Miguel Garcia and catalan independentist. When she was born, one eye had glaucoma and one eye was detached. She competed at the 1996 Summer Paralympics, winning a bronze in the 4 x 100 meter medley 49 Points relay race. She competed at the 2000 Summer Paralympics, winning a gold in the 100 meter freestyle and 400 meter freestyle races. She competed at the 2004 Summer Paralympics, winning a gold in the 100 meter freestyle race. She competed at the  IBSA World Blind Swimming Championships in 2003.  She created 3 world records. One was in the 4x50 meter freestyle S11-S13 race.  Another world record was in the 800 meter freestyle S11 race.  The third world record was in the 4x50 meter medley, S11-S13 race. She is currently the deputy director and head of personal autonomy and adaptation of ONCE, the main agency disabilities Spain.

Notes

References

External links 
 
 

1980 births
Living people
Spanish female freestyle swimmers
Paralympic swimmers of Spain
Paralympic gold medalists for Spain
Paralympic bronze medalists for Spain
Paralympic medalists in swimming
Swimmers at the 1996 Summer Paralympics
Swimmers at the 2000 Summer Paralympics
Swimmers at the 2004 Summer Paralympics
Medalists at the 1996 Summer Paralympics
Medalists at the 2000 Summer Paralympics
Medalists at the 2004 Summer Paralympics
Swimmers from Barcelona
S11-classified Paralympic swimmers
21st-century Spanish women